Stefán Stefánsson may refer to:

 Stefán Jóhann Stefánsson (1894–1980), Icelandic politician; prime minister of Iceland 1947–1949
 Stefán Karl Stefánsson (1975–2018), Icelandic film and stage actor